Alexis Fernand Félix Jean Rivier (21 July 1896 – 6 November 1987) was a French composer of classical music in the neoclassical style.

The son of Henri Rivier, a co-inventor of Armenian paper, he composed over two hundred works, including music for orchestra, chamber groups, chorus, piano, and solo instruments.

Rivier served as Professor of Composition at the Paris Conservatory from 1948 until his retirement in 1966. During the period 1948–1962, he shared this position with famous composer Darius Milhaud. Three of his notable students at the Paris Conservatory were Gareth Walters, Pedro Ipuche Riva, and Gerd Boder.

Quote from Tadlock's dissertation on Rivier
"Jean Rivier (1896–1987), a twentieth-century French composer of the neo-classical school, is remembered primarily for his flute compositions. However, this prolific composer was extremely active in French musical circles from the period after World War I until his death. He composed over two hundred works, including symphonies, chamber music, concertos, choral music, piano works, music for solo instruments, and accompanied songs. For fourteen years, he shared with Darius Milhaud a position as Professor of Composition at the Paris Conservatory, and continued as sole professor from 1962 until his retirement in 1966. Rivier was a founding member of Triton, a musical society that promoted new music, and he was associated extensively with the French Radio (ORTF). Despite his successful career, Rivier's music was often eclipsed by the increasingly avant-garde compositions of more progressive French composers.

Rivier's songs are best represented by his twenty-nine published melodies or poemes, notable for their brevity, attention to detail, and their lyrical melodies, tonal harmonies with creative dissonances, and carefully structured forms (especially ABA forms). With music set to poems by Guillaume Apollinaire, Henri Mahaut, Arthur Rimbaud, Pierre de Ronsard, Clément Marot, Joachim du Bellay, Rene Chalupt, and Paul Gilson, the songs are characterized by quartal and quintal harmonies, modality, polychords, parallelism, contrasting moods, and expressive emotions." – David Michael Tadlock, The published songs of Jean Rivier (dissertation)

Compositions
3 Points Seches for piano
4 Fantasmes for piano
4 Sequences Dialogues (need instrumentation)
Alternances for piano
Andante Espressivo Ed Allegro Burlesco (three movements) for clarinet and piano
Aria for trumpet (or oboe) and organ
Brillances for 2 trumpets, 2 French horns, 2 trombones and 1 tuba
Capriccio (need instrumentation)
Comme Une Tendre Berceuse for flute and piano
Concerto (arranged by Rene Decouais) (need instrumentation)
Concerto for alto saxophone, trumpet and string orchestra (1955)
Concerto for alto saxophone, baritone saxophone, 2 bassoons, trumpet, double bass
Concerto for bassoon and strings. (1963)
Concerto for clarinet and string orchestra (1958)
Concerto for flute and piano
Concerto for oboe and orchestra (or piano) (1966)
Concerto for trumpet and strings 
Concerto #1 in C for piano and orchestra (1940)
Concerto Brève for piano and strings (1953)
Concertino for saxophone and orchestra (or piano)
Concertino for viola and orchestra (1947)
Déjeuner sur l'herbe (need instrumentation)
Doloroso et Giocoso for viola and piano (1969)
Duo for flute and clarinet in Bb
Espagnole for violin and piano
Grave et Presto for saxophone quartet
Nocturne, his contribution to Variations sur le nom de Marguerite Long
Le Petit Gondolier for piano
Les Trois "S" for clarinet
Oiseau tendre for solo flute
Ouverture pour une opérette imaginaire
3 Pastorales for Orchestra (1929) 
Petite suite (for oboe, clarinet & bassoon, 1934)
Piece in D (Pièce en Ré pour contrebasse et piano, 1920)
Pour Des Mains Amies for piano
Priere (need instrumentation)
Quatuor A Cordes #1 (string quartet #1) (1924)
Quatuor A Cordes #2 (string quartet #2) (1940)
Rapsodie for trombone and piano
Requiem (need instrumentation)
Sonate for piano
Stridences for piano
String Trio
 Symphony #1 (1931)
 Symphony #2 in C major for string orchestra (1937)
 Symphony #3 in G major for string orchestra (1937)
 Symphony #4 in B flat major for string orchestra (1947)
 Symphony #5 in A minor (1950)
 Symphony #6 in E minor "Les Présages" (1958)
 Symphony #7 in F major "Les Contrastes" (1971)
 Symphony #8 for string orchestra (1978)
Torrents for piano
Trois Mouvements for clarinet and piano
Virevoltes for flute

His complete piano works have been published in one volume by Salabert.

Discography
Concerto for Alto Saxophone, Trumpet and Orchestra appears on "French Saxophone Concertos", Naxos 8.225127
Concerto for alto saxophone, trumpet and strings appears on "Virtuoso Saxophone Concertos" (Virtuose Saxophonkonzerte), Koch Schwann
Oiseaux tendres appears on "WIESLER, Manuela: Flute Music" Naxos BIS-CD-689
String Quartets No 1 and 2, Mandelring Quartet. Audite 97.710 (2021)
Symphonies #3 in G, #4 in B♭, and #8 in __ (all for strings) Calmel Chamber Orchestra conducted by Bernard Calmel, on Pavane CD ADW 7328 (1994) (currently out of print)

References

External links
Abstract of dissertation on the songs of Jean Rivier by David Michael Tadlock
Rivier Memorial Site

Further reading
Jean Rivier, catalogue des œuvres. Paris: G. Billaudot 1993.
 "Jean Rivier" in Sax, Mule & Co by Jean-Pierre Thiollet, H & D, 2004, p. 169–170

1896 births
1987 deaths
Concert band composers
People from Villemomble
20th-century classical composers
French classical composers
French male classical composers
Conservatoire de Paris alumni
Academic staff of the Conservatoire de Paris
20th-century French composers
20th-century French male musicians